Löwenberg (Mark) is a railway station located in Löwenberger Land, Germany. The station was opened in 1847 is located on the Berlin Northern Railway, Löwenberg-Lindow-Rheinsberger railway and Löwenberg–Prenzlau railway. The train services are operated by Deutsche Bahn and Niederbarnimer Eisenbahn.

Train services
The following services currently call at the station:

Regional services  Rostock / Stralsund - Neustrelitz - Berlin - Wünsdorf-Waldstadt - Elsterwerda
Local services  Templin – Löwenberg – Oranienburg – Berlin
Local services  Rheinsberg – Löwenberg (– Oranienburg – Berlin)

References

Railway stations in Brandenburg
Buildings and structures in Oberhavel
Railway stations in Germany opened in 1877
1877 establishments in Prussia